Maggini may refer to:
Maggini (surname)
Maggini (crater) on Mars
Maggini Quartet, a British string quartet
 "Maggini violins", those made by master craftsman Giovanni Paolo Maggini